Ave Maria by Franz Biebl is a motet composed for double choir, a large four-part choir and a three-part choir which can be performed by soloists. It is a setting of part of the Latin liturgical Angelus prayer, which contains the Ave Maria (Hail Mary) as a refrain. The composition was originally written for men's chorus, but the composer wrote arrangements for mixed choir and women's choir. The work and arrangements were published by Wildt's Musikverlag, first in 1964. The piece first became famous when a U.S. group, the Cornell University Glee Club, included it in their Christmas programs, and more famous when the Chanticleer ensemble made it part of their regular repertoire. It was published in the U.S. by Hinshaw and became one of the publisher's best-selling items.

History 
Biebl was the organist and choir master of a parish in Fürstenfeldbruck, Bavaria, and of a men's chorus there, for which he composed many works and arrangements. He composed Ave Maria sometime before May 1959, when it was performed in a Maiandacht. It was written for men's chorus, and this version was published by Wildt's Musikverlag in 1964. However, it was not performed often, since German men's choirs generally did not perform religious music. On a 1970 tour in Germany, the Cornell University Glee Club from the U.S. met Biebl, who was working for the broadcaster Bayerischer Rundfunk and responsible for choral music. Conductor Thomas A. Sokol received several of Biebl's compositions, which he performed in the U.S. When the Chanticleer vocal ensemble made Ave Maria part of their repertoire, it gained popularity. They first performed it in a charity event on 4 December 1989 at the City Hall in San Francisco, then presented it in subsequent Christmas concerts and included it in their tour program the next year. The work is now considered a standard of the choral repertoire.

Biebl wrote arrangements for mixed choirs in 1985 and 1998. It was published in the U.S. by Hinshaw Music in 1992, and became one of the publisher's best-selling items, the four versions selling over 670,000 copies between 1992 and 2016.

Text 
The text is the beginning of the Latin Catholic liturgical Angelus prayer, three verses based on biblical sources, with the Ave Maria as a refrain. In Biebl's setting, the Ave Maria refrain contains only the first half of the Ave Maria prayer, the benediction of Mary and the fruit of her womb, Jesus. The second half, praying for Mary's intercession, is delivered as a conclusion, deviating slightly from the liturgical text by addressing Mary as Holy Mother twice, asking firstly for intercession with "us sinners", and secondly for "in the hour of our death", while the Ave Maria prayer combines both requests in one. The prayer is closed by Amen.

Music 
The original composition was in D major for men's choir, with a four-part choir TTBB and a three-part choir TTB. When it was published, it was transposed to C major. The verses from the Angelus are recited by one voice in chant-like fashion in free tempo. The refrain is sung by the choirs, with the four-part choir beginning and the three-part choir following one measure later, in an alternating pattern kept throughout the piece. The final choral setting, Sancta Maria, is intensified in vocal range and dynamics, concluding in Amen set in a similar pattern. The choral singing is marked once at the beginning "Ruhig fließend" (Calmly flowing), in common time. The choirs operate in different rhythm: the four-part choir begins with three quarter-notes towards a long note in the second measure, while the three-part choir begins on the first beat in measure two.

Biebl wrote arrangements for SATB/SAT, TTBB/SAA, and SSAA/SSA choirs. The first narration from the Angelus is meant to be sung by basses, the second by second tenors, and the third by first tenors. The three-part choir can be sung by solo voices.

Program note

Wilbur Skeels – who published some of Biebl's other works – prepared the following information about the piece for use in choral program notes.  All or parts of the information in this note are commonly cited by choirs recording or performing the piece.

The piece gained practically no attention in Germany for many years. However, when Biebl was the head of choral programs for the Bayerischen Rundfunk (Bavarian Radio) he made a habit of inviting American choirs to come to Munich and sing on the radio and with other German choirs. One of these choirs was introduced to his Ave Maria and brought it back to the US, where it became increasingly popular. When Chanticleer recorded it, it became a hit, not only in the US but in Germany too, which now considered the piece must be special as it was such a hit in America! Biebl did arrangements for other voicings, and the seven-part mixed choir arrangement is now probably the most popular.

The text is unique in its conjoining of two sources. The first source is the thrice-daily devotional exercise called the Angelus in the Catholic Church. It is cued by the ringing of the "Angelus" bell, sometimes referred to as the "Peace Bell." It consists of a thrice-repeated "Hail Mary," each with an introductory versicle based on the Gospel, followed by a concluding versicle and prayer.

Here is the first part of the Angelus, the only part that Biebl uses:

Angelus Domini nuntiavit Mariae
The Angel of the Lord announced to Mary

Et concepit de Spiritu Sancto.
And she conceived by the Holy Spirit.

[Ave Maria, Sancta Maria.]
[Hail Mary, Holy Mary.]

Maria dixit:
Mary said:

Ecce ancilla Domini
Behold the handmaiden of the Lord

Fiat mihi secundum verbum tuum.
Do to me according to your word.

[Ave Maria, Sancta Maria.]
[Hail Mary, Holy Mary.]

Et verbum caro factum est
And the Word was made flesh

Et habitavit in nobis
And dwelt among us.

[Ave Maria, Sancta Maria]
[Hail Mary, Holy Mary]

[Ora pro nobis sancta Dei genitrix…]

In place of the 'Ave Maria, Sancta Maria' from the Angelus text, Biebl has substituted the first part of the even more familiar text of the standard 'Ave Maria' prayer [Ave Maria, gratia plena, Dominus tecum, etc.] and in lieu of the closing versicle and prayer of the 'Angelus' he has substituted the second part of the 'Ave Maria' [Sancta Maria, Mater Dei, ora pro nobis, etc.], so that the whole is a hybrid of the two ancient texts.

Instrumental arrangements 

The San Francisco Renegades and the Phantom Regiment Drum and Bugle Corps arranged the work for brass band. Specifically, the San Francisco Renegades, an all-age Drum and Bugle Corps, first adapted sections of Biebl's Ave Maria in their 2003 show: "Red Skies At Night".  In 2005 they played the piece as the opener to their show, "The Days of Future Past".  In 2006 the Phantom Regiment Drum and Bugle Corps, an International World Class Corps based in Rockford, Illinois, used the piece in its 2006 field show "Faust," further expanding awareness of Biebl's arrangement.  Both drum and bugle corps continue to perform Franz Biebl's Ave Maria as part of their yearly repertoire.

Several transcriptions and arrangements of the Biebl "Ave Maria" have been written since 2010. One transcription is by Jerry Brubaker, horn player and arranger for 30 years with the US Navy Band, done after hearing the piece sung at a Navy funeral.  It has been performed by the Navy Band horn section and the NIH Community Orchestra Horn Club on numerous occasions. In 2018 Triplo Press of Minneapolis, Minnesota, published an arrangement of the work by James Olcott for 12 trumpets.

Pacific Crest Drum and Bugle Corps uses Franz Biebl's Ave Maria as their corps song.

US First Amendment litigation 

In 2009–10, an arrangement of the Ave Maria for wind ensemble was the subject of litigation that reached the United States Supreme Court. At issue was whether a school district was justified in prohibiting an instrumental performance of the piece (without lyrics) at a high school graduation ceremony due to its underlying religious nature. The United States Court of Appeals for the Ninth Circuit upheld the school district's actions. The Supreme Court declined to hear the case, but Justice Samuel Alito issued a rare written opinion dissenting from the Court's decision.  In a footnote, Alito described Biebl's setting of the Ave Maria text as "relatively obscure" in comparison to settings by Franz Schubert, Charles Gounod, and other more well-known composers.

References

External links 
 
 Index of Biebl's principal works (Archive from 16 July 2011)
 The Fascinating Backstory on Franz Biebl's "Ave Maria" behind-the-music.com
 
 Ave Maria-Franz Biebl–Cornell University Glee Club's 150th anniversary performance

1964 compositions
Motets
Marian hymns